This Is the Life is the third studio album by Canadian country music group Farmer's Daughter, and was released in 1998 by Universal Music Canada.

Track listing

 "Freeway" (Marcus Hummon, Angela Kelman, Jake Leiske, Shauna Rae Samograd) - 4:13
 "Blue Horizon" (Stan Meissner, Kelman, Leiske, Samograd) - 3:41
 "This Is the Life (The Lois and Eddy Song)" (Meissner, Kelman, Leiske, Samograd) - 4:54
 "It's Easy to Tell" (Kostas, Kelman, Leiske, Samograd) - 3:45
 "No Understanding Your Love" (Simone Hardy, Stewart Peters) - 4:09
 "Ballad of Me and You" (Marcus Hummon, Kelman, Leiske, Samograd) - 3:27
 "Let It Ride" (Randy Bachman, Fred Turner) - 3:53
 "Prairie Sky" (Chris Pelcer, Kelman, Leiske, Samograd) - 3:43
 "Overwhelming Sense of Goodbye" (Meissner, Kelman, Leiske, Samograd) - 3:44
 "Wait for Me" (Chris Rodriguez, Kelman, Leiske, Samograd) - 3:55
 "Little Church in Memphis" (Kostas, Kelman, Leiske, Samograd) - 3:56
 "Willie" (Amos Gypson) - 2:45

See also
Music of Canada

Farmer's Daughter albums
1998 albums